Bobbili is one of the 34 mandals in Vizianagaram district of Andhra Pradesh, India. Bobbili town is the headquarters of the mandal. The mandal is bounded by Makkuva, Seethanagaram, Balajipeta, Salur, Ramabhadrapuram, Badangi and Therlam mandals.

Demographics

 census, the mandal had a population of 122,964. The total population constitute, 61,092 males and 61,872 females —a sex ratio of 1013 females per 1000 males. 12,369 children are in the age group of 0–6 years, of which 6,383 are boys and 5,984 are girls —a ratio of 938 per 1000. The average literacy rate stands at 63.99% with 70,768 literates.

Government and politics 

Bobbili mandal is one of the mandal in Bobbili (Assembly constituency), which in turn is a part of Vizianagaram (Lok Sabha constituency), one of the 25 Lok Sabha constituencies representing Andhra Pradesh. The present MLA is Venkata Sujay Krishna Ranga Rao Ravu, who won the Andhra Pradesh Legislative Assembly election, 2014 representing YSRCP.  Bobbili was a Lok Sabha constituency till 2008.

Towns and villages 

Bobbili is a municipal town in the mandal. Alajangi is the most populated and Vakadavalasa is the least populated village in the mandal.  census, the mandal has 9 settlements, that includes:

See also
 Bobbili
 Vizianagaram district Ramabhadrapuram

References 

Mandals in Vizianagaram district